Zygmunt Antoni Smalcerz (born 8 June 1941) is a retired Polish weightlifter who won the gold medal in the flyweight class at the 1972 Olympics. He also competed at the 1976 Games but had to withdraw due to injury.

In 2002 he was elected member of the International Weightlifting Federation Hall of Fame.

He was the head coach of the Polish weightlifting team for the run-up and including the 2008 Beijing Olympics.

From 2010 through 2017, he was the resident weightlifting coach at the United States Olympic Training Center in Colorado Springs.

As of 2020, he works as the Head Coach of the Norwegian Weightlifting Federation.

References

External links

1941 births
Polish male weightlifters
Weightlifters at the 1972 Summer Olympics
Weightlifters at the 1976 Summer Olympics
Olympic gold medalists for Poland
Living people
Olympic medalists in weightlifting
People from Bielsko County
Sportspeople from Silesian Voivodeship
Medalists at the 1972 Summer Olympics
World Weightlifting Championships medalists